Magdalena Łuczak (born 31 December 2001) is a Polish alpine skier. She competed at the  2022 Winter Olympics, in Women's slalom, Women's giant slalom.

Career 
She competed at the 2021–22 FIS Alpine Ski World Cup.

She skis for University of Colorado.

References

External links  

2001 births
Living people
Alpine skiers at the 2022 Winter Olympics
Polish female alpine skiers
Olympic alpine skiers of Poland
21st-century Polish women